The Swedish Chamber of Commerce (SCC), founded in 1906, is an independent, nonprofit Swedish-British business organisation. The Chamber has around 400 member businesses, representing not only Swedish companies but also British and European companies interested in strengthening their existing ties with Sweden and the UK or expanding to new markets. The Swedish Chamber of Commerce for the UK is the oldest and largest foreign Swedish Chamber in the world, and also one of the largest foreign Chambers in the UK.

Young Professionals of the Swedish Chamber 
In addition, a sub-organisation, the Young Professionals (YP), has approximately 200 individual Members, aged 25–35 with an interest in the Swedish-British business community.

History 
The subject of a London Chamber was first discussed in early 1906, when a number of meetings regarding the arrangement of a Swedish exhibition, led to the establishment of the Swedish Chamber of Commerce in London. The Certificate of Incorporation was granted by the Board of Trade and offices were hired at 136, Fenchurch Street. At the end of 1907 no less than 189 members had been elected.

Former Chairmen 
 1906–1915 Fred Löwenadler
 1915–1924 Harald Benedixson
 1924–1932 Axel Welin
 1932–1933 F Ljungberg
 1933–1941 B De Maré
 1941–1944 O Thott
 1944–1946 T Landby
 1946–1950 N H Leander
 1950–1959 S Frisell
 1959–1963 Torolf Lyth
 1963–1967 Torsten J Mosesson
 1967–1970 A A Flygt
 1970–1971 Hans L. Zetterberg
 1971–1974 Gunnar Englund
 1974–1977 Kurt Domellöf
 1977–1981 Keith Lomas
 1981–1984 Jan Ancarcrona
 1984–1986 Sir Jeffrey Petersen
 1986–1989 Bertil Norinder
 1989–1994 Duncan MacDougall
 1994–1996 Staffan Gadd
 1996–1999 Alan Toulson
 1999–2002 Anders Grundberg
 2003–2004 Claes Oscarson
 2004–2007 Roger Gifford
 2007–2010 Bo Lerenius, CBE
 2010–2013 Paul von der Heyde
 2013–2017 Beatrice Engström Bondy
 2017– now Jan Olsson

Former Managing Directors 

 1906-1917 Louis Zettersten
 1917-1919 C W Cederwall
 1919-1943 Dr. E Classen
 1943-1945 E Steffenburg
 1945-1963 Einar Kihlstedt
 1963-1967 Curt Björnemark
 1967-1972 Staffan Widenfelt
 1972-1977 Vacant
 1978-1983 Leif Forsberg
 1983-1994 Gunnar Fineman
 1994-1999 Pia Helena Ormerod
 1999-2004 Ulla O'Barius
 2004-2009 Christina Liljeström
 2009-2012 Annika Wahlberg
 2012-2018 Ulla Nilsson
 2018- now Peter Sandberg

References

External links 
 Official website
 The Swedish Embassy in London
 Chamber of Commerce
 Swedish Chamber of Commerce Abroad

Chambers of commerce
Sweden–United Kingdom relations
Organizations established in 1906
1906 establishments in the United Kingdom